Pauline Newman (born June 20, 1927) is a United States circuit judge of the United States Court of Appeals for the Federal Circuit.

Education and career
Born in New York City, New York to Maxwell H. and Rosella G. Newman, Newman received a Bachelor of Arts degree from Vassar College in 1947, a Master of Arts from Columbia University in 1948, a Doctor of Philosophy in chemistry from Yale University in 1952 and a Bachelor of Laws from New York University School of Law in 1958. She worked as a research scientist for American Cyanamid from 1951 to 1954. From 1954 to 1984, Newman worked for FMC Corp., for fifteen years (1954–1969) as a patent attorney and in-house counsel, and for another fifteen years (1969–1984) as director of the Patent, Trademark and Licensing Department.

From 1961 to 1962 Newman also worked for the United Nations Educational, Scientific and Cultural Organization (UNESCO) as a science policy specialist in the Department of Natural Resources. She served on the State Department Advisory Committee on International Intellectual Property from 1974 to 1984 and on the advisory committee to the Domestic Policy Review of Industrial Innovation from 1978 to 1979. From 1982 to 1984, she was Special Adviser to the United States Delegation to the Diplomatic Conference on the Revision of the Paris Convention for the Protection of Industrial Property. Over her career, Newman has received honors including the Wilbur Cross Medal of Yale University Graduate School, and the Award for Outstanding Contributions to International Cooperation from the Pacific Industrial Property Association.

Federal judicial service

On January 30, 1984, President Ronald Reagan nominated Newman to the United States Court of Appeals for the Federal Circuit to a seat vacated by Judge Philip Nichols Jr. who took senior status on October 1, 1983. She was confirmed by the United States Senate on February 27, 1984, and received her commission the following day. Newman thus became the first judge appointed directly to the Federal Circuit, all of her predecessors having come to the court through the merger of the Court of Customs and Patent Appeals and the appellate division of the United States Court of Federal Claims. She has also been an adjunct professor at the George Mason University School of Law.

Another judge of the Federal Circuit, Giles Rich, was the oldest active federal judge in the history of the United States when he died 10 days after his 95th birthday in 1999; Newman surpassed that record on June 30, 2022.

Jurisprudence

Newman has authored a number of important opinions setting forth the law of patents in the United States. In Arrhythmia Research Technology, Inc. v. Corazonix Corp., she wrote an opinion for the panel finding that the use of an algorithm as a step in a process did not render the process unpatentable. In In re Recreative Technologies Corp., she wrote the opinion finding that the Board of Patent Appeals and Interferences exceeded its authority when it considered a claim of obviousness in the reexamination of a patent previously held by the examiner not to be obvious with respect to the references cited. In Intergraph Corporation v. Intel Corporation, she highlighted the right of a patent owner to refuse to license, even to a party that has become completely dependent on the patent. In Jazz Photo Corp. v. United States International Trade Commission, she clarified the law of repair and reconstruction (permitting the owner of a patented item to fix the item when it breaks, but not to essentially build a new item from the parts of an old one), writing that it was not a patent infringement for one party to restore another party's patented "one-use" camera to be used a second time.

With respect to the court's federal contracts jurisprudence, in 2010 she wrote a dissenting opinion in M. Maropakis Carpentry, Inc. v. United States. Stanfield Johnson has called her the court's "great dissenter". He has said that her dissents in the area of federal contracts "consistently reflect the view that a primary responsibility of the court is to serve 'the national policy of fairness to contractors'". He writes:
At the core of Judge Newman's dissenting jurisprudence is the premise that the sovereign as a contracting party should be accountable for its actions, subject only to limited exceptions not to be presumed, unnecessarily expanded, or imposed in a formalistic doctrinaire way that ignores or masks the facts of government conduct. Where the facts justify it, contractors should be entitled to a 'fair and just' remedy, and the Federal Circuit is there to make sure this happens.

References

Sources

External links
Judge Newman speaks about the Federal Circuit

1927 births
Living people
20th-century American judges
20th-century American women judges
21st-century American chemists
21st-century American women
American women chemists
Columbia University alumni
George Mason University School of Law faculty
Judges of the United States Court of Appeals for the Federal Circuit
New York University School of Law alumni
United States court of appeals judges appointed by Ronald Reagan
Vassar College alumni
Yale University alumni